Majdan Wielki is a village in the administrative district of Gmina Krasnobród, within Zamość County, Lublin Voivodeship, in southeastern Poland.

The village has a population of 916.

On September 20, 1939, during the joint German-Soviet invasion of Poland, which started World War II, German troops carried out a massacre of 42 Polish prisoners of war in the village (see also Nazi crimes against the Polish nation). At least one Polish soldier survived the massacre.

References

Villages in Zamość County
Nazi war crimes in Poland
World War II prisoner of war massacres by Nazi Germany